

562001–562100 

|-bgcolor=#f2f2f2
| colspan=4 align=center | 
|}

562101–562200 

|-bgcolor=#f2f2f2
| colspan=4 align=center | 
|}

562201–562300 

|-bgcolor=#f2f2f2
| colspan=4 align=center | 
|}

562301–562400 

|-bgcolor=#f2f2f2
| colspan=4 align=center | 
|}

562401–562500 

|-id=446
| 562446 Pilinszky ||  || János Pilinszky (1921–1981), a Hungarian poet, best-known for his poems about the horrors of a prisoner of war and the life under a communist dictatorship. || 
|}

562501–562600 

|-bgcolor=#f2f2f2
| colspan=4 align=center | 
|}

562601–562700 

|-bgcolor=#f2f2f2
| colspan=4 align=center | 
|}

562701–562800 

|-bgcolor=#f2f2f2
| colspan=4 align=center | 
|}

562801–562900 

|-bgcolor=#f2f2f2
| colspan=4 align=center | 
|}

562901–563000 

|-bgcolor=#f2f2f2
| colspan=4 align=center | 
|}

References 

562001-563000